Robyn M. Denholm (born 27 May 1963) is an Australian business executive. In November 2018, Denholm succeeded Elon Musk as chair of Tesla, Inc.

Early life
Denholm was born on 27 May 1963 in Milperra, New South Wales. Her parents met and married in Tripoli, Libya, immigrating to Australia in the 1950s. She has Maltese and Italian ancestry on her father's side and Maltese and Scottish ancestry on her mother's side; her father spoke five languages.

Denholm grew up in the Sydney suburb of Lugarno with her older brother and younger sister. Her father worked as a welder and her mother was a ledger machine operator. When she was seven years old, the family purchased a service station and workshop in Milperra. Denholm handled the financial accounts, repaired cars, pumped petrol and became interested in cars. She attended Peakhurst High School.

Denholm graduated from the University of Sydney with a bachelor's degree in economics, and from the University of New South Wales in 1999 with a master's degree in commerce. Denholm is a member of Institute of Chartered Accountants in Australia and New Zealand.

Career
After graduating, Denholm worked in accountancy for Arthur Andersen in Sydney. This was followed by seven years at Toyota Australia. Denholm worked at the IT companies Sun Microsystems, and then Juniper Networks for nine years in finance and operations roles, rising to chief financial officer of Juniper. In 2014, Denholm became a non-executive director of Tesla, Inc. In the following four years as a non-executive director of Tesla, including as chair of the audit committee, Denholm received 17 million in Tesla stock options.

In early-2017, Denholm was appointed as chief operations officer (COO) of Telstra, Australia's largest telecoms company, subsequently becoming chief financial officer (CFO) on 1 October 2018. In November 2018, Denholm gave notice of resignation after only five weeks in the role as a result of stepping into the role of chair of Tesla Inc. Telstra CEO Andy Penn announced that Denholm would end her responsibilities as CFO at Telstra on 6 May 2019.

Net worth 
Denholm debuted on The Australian Financial Review Rich List in 2021 with a net worth of 688 million.

Other activities
In 2022, Denholm's family office Wollemi Capital Group purchased a 30% stake in the Sydney Kings and Sydney Uni Flames basketball teams.

Personal life
Denholm is married to David Taylor, a retired electrical engineer. She has a son and a daughter.

References

External links
 

Living people
Chief financial officers
1963 births
University of Sydney alumni
University of New South Wales alumni
Tesla, Inc. people
Australian chairpersons of corporations
21st-century Australian businesspeople
Businesspeople from Sydney
Australian accountants
Automotive businesspeople
Australian people of Maltese descent
Australian people of Italian descent
Australian people of Scottish descent
Sports owners